Eastport is a long-popular Newfoundland vacation destination on the Eastport Peninsula.
Eastport is located on the north-eastern border of Terra Nova National Park and is known for its sandy beaches, scenery and traditional Newfoundland outport heritage.

Geography 
Climate

Demographics 

See also 
Eastport Peninsula
Terra Nova National Park

References

External links
 Town of Eastport website
Eastport - Encyclopedia of Newfoundland and Labrador, vol.1, p. 665.

Towns in Newfoundland and Labrador